Allen Andrews (25 April 1913 – September 1985) was a British author. He was educated at Bancroft School and St John's College, Oxford, and served with the Royal Air Force during the Second World War. He worked as a writer at several newspapers before starting a freelance career in 1957. He became a historian who is the author of a number of fine British histories, biographies, and company histories as well. Many of his books have been translated into foreign languages.

Publications
Proud Fortress: The Fighting Story of Gibraltar (1959)
Earthquake (1963)
The Mad Motorists: The Great Peking-Paris Race of '07 (1964)
Relax and sleep well (1965)
Those Magnificent Men in Their Flying Machines (1965)
The Splendid Pauper (1968) 
Prosecutor: The Life of M. P. Pugh, Prosecuting Solicitor and Agent for the Director of Public Prosecutions (1968)
Quotations for Speakers and Writers (1969)
Monte Carlo or Bust: Those Daring Young Men in Their Flying Jalopies (1969)
The Royal Whore: Barbara Villiers, Countess of Castlemaine (1970)
The Air Marshals (1970)
Intensive inquiries: Seven Chief Constables open CID files on their most Remarkable Murder Investigations (1973)
The Follies of King Edward VII (1975)
Kings and Queens of England and Scotland (1976)
The King who lost America (1976)
The Whiskey Barons (1977)
The Life of L. S. Lowry (1977)
Wonders of Victorian Engineering (1978)
Exemplary Justice (1978)
The Pig Plantagenet (1980)
Castle Crespin (1982)

Adaptations
 CBS Storybreak episode "The Pig Plantagenet" (1985)
 Those Magnificent Men in Their Flying Machines Film (1965)
 Monte Carlo or Bust!, released in the United States as Those Daring Young Men in Their Jaunty Jalopies Film (1969)

References

1913 births
1985 deaths
People from Greenwich
Royal Air Force airmen
Royal Air Force personnel of World War II
20th-century English historians
Alumni of St John's College, Oxford
20th-century English male writers